Bill or William Schultz may refer to:

Bill Schultz (American football) (born 1967), American retired football player
Bill Schultz (producer) (born 1960), American television producer
Bill Schultz (Fender) (1926–2006), CEO of Fender Musical Instruments Corporation
Bill Schultz (rugby league, born 1891) (1891–1975), Australian rugby league footballer
William Schultz (rugby league) (1938–2015), known as Bill, New Zealand rugby league footballer
William L. Schultz (1923–2009), American circus performer, teacher, and writer
Captain Willy Schultz, a comic book character

See also
William Schulz (disambiguation), including Bill Schulz